Veli-Pekka Lehtola is a North Sámi historian and academic. He is professor of Sámi culture at the Giellagas Institute of the University of Oulu, Finland. He is known for his research in Sami culture. He is also politically active, promoting a narrow definition of Sámi groups towards the Finnish government.

References

1957 births
Living people
People from Inari, Finland
Academic staff of the University of Oulu
Finnish Sámi academics